This is a list of stations of the Kryvyi Rih Metrotram. The metrotram currently consists of three routes and 15 stations, with another additional station left abandoned and unfinished (Vovnopriadylna). The stations are listed geographically from north to south.

References

External links